Nirmala Sheoran (born 15 July 1995) is an Indian sprinter who specializes in the 400 metres event.

Early life and career
Sheoran was born in Chehad Khurd village of Haryana state's Bhiwani district.

She qualified for two events at the 2016 Summer Olympics: the women's 400 metres and the women's 4 × 400 metres relay.

Sheoran qualified for the women's 400 metres event at the Olympics by clocking 51.48 seconds, her personal best time, at the National Inter-State Senior Athletics championships in Hyderabad in July 2016. She finished well below the Olympics qualification mark of 52.20 seconds and also surpassed the previous best time at the meet of 51.73 seconds set by M. R. Poovamma in 2014. Sheoran's time in the heats of the same event was 52.35 seconds, while her previous personal best of 53.94 seconds was set in 2013 at Chennai.

Sheoran also qualified for the Olympics in the women's 4 × 400 metres relay event. The quartet of Sheoran, Poovamma, Tintu Lukka and Anilda Thomas clocked 3:27.88 at Bangalore in July 2016, finishing with the 12th best time in the world as top 16 relay teams qualified for the Olympics.

In 2017 she was part of the winning 4 × 400 m team who took gold at the 2017 Asian Athletics Championships in Bhubaneshwar. The team was Nirmla, Mazumdar, M. R. Poovamma and Jisna Mathew.

In 2019, she is received a four-year doping ban, starting just after her personal best timing of 51.25 in 2018. In addition all her results from August 2016 were voided including her medal winning efforts in 2017

References

1995 births
Living people
Indian female sprinters
21st-century Indian women
21st-century Indian people
People from Bhiwani district
Sportswomen from Haryana
Olympic athletes of India
Athletes (track and field) at the 2016 Summer Olympics
Athletes (track and field) at the 2018 Asian Games
Athletes from Haryana
Asian Games competitors for India
Olympic female sprinters